The National Olympic Committee of the Republic of Uzbekistan (Latinised-) is the National Olympic Committee representing Uzbekistan. It was founded in the year of 1992, although it was not recognised by the International Olympic Committee until 1 January 1993. The headquarters of the committee is in the capital city of Tashkent. The incumbent-President of the national committee, Rustam Shoabdurahmonov.

Sports Federations 
Boxing Federation of Uzbekistan

Chairman: Achilbay Dzhumaniyazovich Ramatov

First Deputy Chairman: Saken Dzhetibayevich Polatov

General Secretary: Shohid Tillaboev

Date of foundation: 1992

The Judo Federation of Uzbekistan

Chairman: Kamilov Azizjon Yakubdzhanovich

General Secretary:  Jamshid Nasritddinov

Date of foundation: 1991

Wrestling Association of Uzbekistan

Chairman: Salim Kirgizbaevich Abduvaliev

General Secretary: Mamadaliyev Shukhrat Farkhadovich

Vice-Chairmen: Shofaiziev Shomurod Mukhsinovich

Date of foundation: 1998.

Taekwondo Association (WTF) of Uzbekistan

Chairman: Sherzod Rikhsibaevich Tashmatov

General Secretary: Isroilov Abduzaim

Tennis Federation of Uzbekistan

Chairman: Mirsoatov Alisher Kudratullaevich

General Secretary: Tulyaganova Iroda Batyrovna

Date of foundation: 1999

Weightlifting Federation of Uzbekistan

Chairman: Zakirov Botir Irkinovich

General Secretary: Abdukarimov Bakhtiyar Abdurakhimovich

First Deputy Chairman: Shakhrullo Sharipovich Makhmudov

Date of foundation: 2001

Fencing Federation of Uzbekistan

Chairman: Abdusamatov Maqsud Abduvaliyevich

General Secretary: Gulnara Tulkunovna Saidova

Date of foundation: 1992

Football Association of Uzbekistan

Chairman: Azizov Abdusalom Abdumavlonovich

General Secretary: Avaz Parkhatovich Maksumov

First Deputy Chairman: Irmatov Ravshan Saifutdinovich

Date of foundation: 1992

Federation of Horse Breeding and Equestrian Sports of Uzbekistan

Chairman: Bakhromjon Gaziev

General Secretary: Ibragimov Nodirbek Anvarbekovich

Date of foundation: 1997

Uzbekistan Athletics Federation

Chairman: Abdullayev Mekhriddin Razzakovich 

Deputy chairman: Andrey Khakimovich Abduvaliev

General Secretary: Komoliddin Fakhriddinovich Ruzamukhamedov

Date of foundation: 1992

Uzbekistan Volleyball Federation

Chairman: Toshqulov Abduqodir Hamidovich

General Secretary: Nasrullaev Husan

Date of foundation: 1991

Uzbekistan Handball Federation

Chairman: Amonjon Mukhammatyaminovich Musayev

General Secretary: Matkhalikov Ismail Ikramovich

Date of foundation: 1992

Table Tennis Federation of Uzbekistan

Chairman: Kudbiyev Sherzod Davlyatovich

General Secretary: Acting Baymukhamedov Oybek Shukhratovich

Date of foundation: 1993

Field Hockey Federation of Uzbekistan

Chairman: Akhmedov Bahodir Mazhidovich

General Secretary: Yuldashev Sunnatilla Turabovich

Date of foundation: 1994

Rowing & Canoe Federation of Uzbekistan

Chairman: Sultanov Alisher Saidabbasovich

General Secretary: Vyacheslav S. Diedrich

Date of foundation: 1992

Uzbekistan Rugby Federation

Chairman: Safayev Sadyk Salikhovich

General Secretary: Dzhalilov Kakhramon Khakimovich

Date of foundation: 2001

Water Sports Federation of Uzbekistan

Chairman: Kuvandyk Sanakulovich Sanakulov

Secretary General: Ganiev Alisher Abdumazhitovich

First Deputy Chairman: Gulyamov Saidakhrol Ganievich

Date of foundation: 1992

Cycling Federation of Uzbekistan

Chairman: Tanzila Kamalovna Narbaeva

General Secretary: Kazim Bakhtierovich Urinbaykhodzhaev

Date of foundation: 1991

Archery Federation of Uzbekistan

Chairman: Djurayev Rustam Mirzayevich 

Vise-president: Imamov Otabek Sabitdzhanovich

Date of foundation: 2005

Shooting Sports Federation of Uzbekistan

Chairman: Oybek Kabildzhanovich Norinboev

General Secretary: Davranov Mardonbek Farhadovich

Date of foundation: 1998

Triathlon Federation of Uzbekistan

Chairman: Makhmudov Viktor Vladimirovich

Deputy Chairman: Nasyrov Farrukh

General Secretary: Kun Elena

Date of foundation: May 3, 2019

Basketbol Federation of Uzbekistan

Chairman: Davletov Ruslanbek Kuroltoevich

General Secretary: Ravshan Muminjanovich Ganiev

Date of foundation: 1992.

Modern Penthathlon Federation of Uzbekistan

Chairman: Bakhromjon Gaziev

General Secretary: Ksenia Sergeevna Gulyamova

Date of foundation: 2017

Association of Winter Sports of Uzbekistan

Chairman: Iskander Kasimovich Shadiev

General Secretary: Asatullaev Sherzod Khasankhodzhayevich V. V. B.

Date of foundation: 2011

Uzbekistan Federation of Bodybuilding and Fitness 

Chairman: Abdurakhmanov Odil Qalandarovich

Vice Presidnet: Timur Sabirov

General Secretary: Farhad Matkarimov

Date of foundation: 2005

References

External links 
National Olympic Committee of the Republic of Uzbekistan
O'zbekiston Milliy Olimpiya qo'mitasi

Uzbekistan
Olympic
Uzbekistan at the Olympics
1992 establishments in Uzbekistan
Sports organizations established in 1992